Ditha is a genus of pseudoscorpions in the family Tridenchthoniidae. There are about 14 described species in Ditha.

Species
These 14 species belong to the genus Ditha:

References

Further reading

External links

 

Tridenchthoniidae
Pseudoscorpion genera